is a Japanese football player, currently playing for Ventforet Kofu, on loan from Matsumoto Yamaga FC.

Career
Shusuke Yonehara joined J2 League club Roasso Kumamoto in 2015. He debuted in Emperor's Cup.

Career statistics

Last update: 27 February 2019

References

External links

1998 births
Living people
Association football people from Kumamoto Prefecture
Japanese footballers
J1 League players
J2 League players
J3 League players
Roasso Kumamoto players
Matsumoto Yamaga FC players
Ventforet Kofu players
Association football midfielders